Qarah Zia od Din Rural District is in the Central District of Chaypareh County, West Azerbaijan province, Iran. At the National Census of 2006, its population (as a part of the former Chaypareh District of Khoy County) was 5,785 in 1,333 households. There were 5,927 inhabitants in 1,583 households at the following census of 2011, by which time the district was separated from the county, established as Chaypareh County, and divided into two districts. At the most recent census of 2016, the population of the rural district was 7,503 in 2,115 households. The largest of its 35 villages was Qarah Kandi, with 2,141 people.

References 

Chaypareh County

Rural Districts of West Azerbaijan Province

Populated places in West Azerbaijan Province

Populated places in Chaypareh County